Gopalakrishnayya and Gopalkrishnaiah (Telugu: గోపాలకృష్ణయ్య) refer to Gopal (Krishna) and are used as a given name in India.

People named Gopalakrishnayya
 Duggirala Gopalakrishnayya, was an Indian freedom fighter and member of the Indian National Congress.
 Vavilala Gopalakrishnayya, a legislator in Andhra Pradesh.

Masculine given names